Qasr al-Hayr may refer to:
Qasr al-Hayr al-Sharqi
Qasr al-Hayr al-Gharbi